The following highways are numbered 578:

Hungary
 Main road 578 (Hungary)

United States
Maryland
  Maryland Route 578

Territories
  Puerto Rico Highway 578